The second government of Mohamed Ould Bilal is the incumbent 17th government of the Islamic Republic of Mauritania, in office since 1 April 2022. It is a coalition between the Union for the Republic, which rebranded itself as El Insaf in July 2022, and the Union for Democracy and Progress, whose leader Naha Mint Mouknass is the only member representing the party.

Background
The government was formed after Prime Minister Mohamed Ould Bilal resigned with his government on 29 March 2022, with him being re-nominated by President Mohamed Ould Ghazouani the following day. The government change was blamed on severe criticism of the government's performance by Ghazouani, with the president saying on a speech on 24 March 2022 that "Most ministries do not have enough staff to solve the problems of citizens. This is unacceptable. There is a huge lack of oversight of public services".

Cabinet changes
Ould Bilal's second government saw two reshuffles:

 On 6 September 2022, a presidential decree was published announcing changes in several ministries, which was announced minutes after Mauritanian media announced that Moulaye Ould Mohamed Laghdaf, who was previously PM during ex-president Mohamed Ould Abdel Aziz's first term, was appointed Minister Secretary-General of the Presidency of the Republic, an office which is considered to be parallel to the Prime Minister in Mauritanian politics. Mauritanian digital SaharaMedia reported that the move came after a long meeting between President Mohamed Ould Ghazouani and Ould Mohamed Laghdaf and that it was done in order for El Insaf to have a "quiet man" that could negotiate with the opposition and help the party prepare itself for the upcoming parliamentary and presidential election. In a similar move, newly-appointed leader of El Insaf Mohamed Melainine Ould Eyih left the government, while several ministers changed their offices, with only the new Minister of Livestock Brahim Vall Ould Mohamed Lemine being a brand new appointment. The cabinet also saw the return of Nani Ould Chrougha, who left the government in 2020 after his involvement in a corruption case during the presidency of Ould Abdel Aziz. He was subsequently appointed Minister of Equipement and Transports and government spokesperson.

 On 26 September 2022, the ministries of National Education and Reform of Education System, Public Service and Labor, and Livestock and the Minister Secretary-General of the Government were replaced.

Ministers
The list of members was announced by the presidency of the Republic on 1 April, taking position immediately. The following table has been updated to reflect the two reshuffles that happened.

Footnotes

References

Cabinets established in 2022
Bilal
2022 establishments in Africa